GHC may refer to:

Education
 Georgia Highlands College, in Rome, Georgia, US
 Global Health College, in Alexandria, Virginia, US
 Grays Harbor College, in Aberdeen, Washington, US
 Granada Hills Charter High School, in Granada Hills, California, US

Organisations
 Global Health Corps
 Global Health Council
 Group Health Cooperative
 Graham Holdings Company, an American conglomerate

Technology
 Glasgow Haskell Compiler, a compiler for the functional programming language Haskell
 Global Hybrid Cooperation, a set of vehicle technologies
 Grace Hopper Celebration of Women in Computing
 Guitar Hero Carabiner, a gaming device
 Guarded Horn clause, in concurrent logic programming

Other uses
 Great Harbour Cay Airport (IATA airport code), in the Bahamas
 Hiberno-Scottish Gaelic, a language used in Ireland and Scotland from the 13th to the 18th century
 Global Honored Crown, the championships in the Japanese promotion Pro Wrestling Noah

See also
 Ghanaian cedi (currency sign: GH₵), the currency of Ghana